West Haven Historic District is a national historic district located at Rocky Mount, Nash County, North Carolina.  It encompasses 181 contributing buildings and 2 contributing sites in a residential section of Rocky Mount. The buildings primarily date between about 1928 and 1952, and include notable examples of Renaissance Revival, Tudor Revival, Colonial Revival, and Classical Revival style residential architecture.  Notable buildings include the Robert D. Gorham residence (1928), H. Alex Easley House (1934), Leon Epstein house (1928), and Thomas Pearsall House (1933).

It was listed on the National Register of Historic Places in 2002.

References

Historic districts on the National Register of Historic Places in North Carolina
Renaissance Revival architecture in North Carolina
Tudor Revival architecture in North Carolina
Colonial Revival architecture in North Carolina
Neoclassical architecture in North Carolina
National Register of Historic Places in Nash County, North Carolina